Ice island may refer to:

Iceberg, particularly a tabular iceberg
Pobeda Ice Island, a periodic island formed when a tabular iceberg runs aground
Ice Island, a fictional setting from the video game Kirby: Squeak Squad

See also
 Iceland (disambiguation)